Jo Jones Plus Two is an album recorded by drummer Jo Jones in 1958 and released by the Vanguard label.

Reception

AllMusic reviewer Scott Yanow stated "a trio session with pianist Ray Bryant and bassist Tommy Bryant. There is a liberal amount of drum soloing but the early versions of Ray Bryant's "Cubano Chant" and "Little Susie" are of greatest interest".

Track listing
All compositions by Ray Bryant except where noted
 "Satin Doll" (Duke Ellington) – 5:51
 "Little Susie" (Ray Bryant, Jo Jones, Tommy Bryant) – 5:18
 "Spider Kelly's Blues" – 4:44
 "Cubano Chant" – 3:58
 "Splittin'" – 4:51
 "Sweet Lorraine" (Cliff Burwell, Mitchell Parish) – 4:38
 "Bicycle for Two" (Tommy Bryant) – 2:37
 "Old Man River" (Jerome Kern, Oscar Hammerstein II) – 6:39
 "Sometimes I'm Happy" (Vincent Youmans, Irving Caesar) – 3:27

Personnel 
Jo Jones – drums
Ray Bryant – piano
Tommy Bryant – bass

References 

1959 albums
Jo Jones albums
Vanguard Records albums